Tazehabad-e Shir Ali (also Romanized as Tāzehābād-e Shīr ʿAlī) is a village in Nasrabad Rural District (Kermanshah Province), in the Central District of Qasr-e Shirin County, Kermanshah Province, Iran. At the 2006 census, its population was 48, in 9 families.

References 

Populated places in Qasr-e Shirin County